Wes Madiko (15 January 1964 – 25 June 2021), better known mononymously as Wes, was a Cameroonian musician. He is probably best known among Western audiences for his cover of "Upendi", from The Lion King II: Simba's Pride, as well as work with Deep Forest and his own 1997 hit "Alane" produced by Michel Sanchez.

In late 2010, he was working on a new project with electronic composer and producer Paul Kwitek.

He died on June 25, 2021, in Paris, France, due to a nosocomial infection after a medical operation.

Background

Madiko was born in Mouataba, some hundred miles away from the city of Douala, Cameroon. From the age of two, his grandfather taught him about music and how to play the kalimba. The pair soon became inseparable. His grandfather taught him his love of Bantu history and the wisdom of the elephant within animist Bantu philosophy. This was responsible for an important part of his education: "it was in bush school and during night-time gatherings listening to the metallic beat of the kalimba that I learned the adventures of the father of all ancestors, E'kwa Mutu."

In 1974, at the age of ten, Madiko became the conductor of the group Kwa Kwassi, which means "think right". This musical formation brought together the most talented youngsters in the village, who received instruction together in history and art.

Musical career
In 1988, the group Fakol with Benjamin Valfroy and Jo Sene was formed. Fakol played in the Netherlands and in other countries throughout Europe. Aside from his musical activity, Wes started to develop an involvement in social work. He visited schools in Lille, and worked with children. Wes took great pleasure in transmitting the wisdom of the elephants and the ancient history of Africa.

Two years after, Jacques, Wes's brother and a talented guitarist, died. Their father died a few months later, following a motorbike accident. These incidents led Wes to meditate on the fragility of the self, saying: "there comes a time when a feeling of uselessness invades you and threatens to break you, but you hang in there, convinced that there 's always a breath of life somewhere."

In 1992, Wes traveled to the US and released the album "Sun of Ancestors". During this tour, he gave concerts in Atlanta, Georgia. In this period Wes also met Michel Sanchez of Deep Forest with whom he formed an artistic collaboration, starting work on the album Welenga, which means "Universal Conscience". In 1996 Wes signed with Sony Music France to release Welenga. Thus Wes became one of the first stars of the group Deep Forest earning a Grammy Award.

He gave concerts in Sydney, Melbourne, Brisbane, in Japan, Hungary, Poland, and Prague. The French TV channel TF1 called Alane the summer song of the year 1997. From 1997 on Wes performed a G7 concert with Deep Forest in Lyon, France, and is known as a multi-talented artist whose music enriches the world, as well for his humanity as an individual concerned with the plight of children and those less fortunate in the world. Wes is the first African artist with a recording going diamond. At the 10th Anniversary of the World Music Awards in Monaco, presided over by Prince Albert, Wes received the Award for best record sale of the year by an African artist (6 May 1998). In the same year he performed I love Football for the FIFA World Cup in France.

In 2002, Wes' song "Awa Awa" was featured in Paramount Pictures' The Wild Thornberrys Movie, as well as the episode Falsche Partner of the German series Ein Fall für zwei. "Alane" was used in the German films Zahn um Zahn and Aus heiterem Himmel. In 2007, Wes was working on a new biography and spiritual book.

Discography

Studio albums

Singles

References

External links
Former official website
 
 

1964 births
2021 deaths
Cameroonian musicians
People from Littoral Region (Cameroon)